Klebsormidium is a genus of filamentous charophyte green algae comprising 20 species. The name was proposed in 1972 to resolve confusion in application and status of Hormidium and was given for the German botanist Georg Albrecht Klebs. 

The algae occurs mostly in soil and on moist substrates, nevertheless, aquatic and one marine species are also known. Many Klebsormidium-species are able to synthesize substances for UV protection, the so-called mycosporine-like amino acids. The draft genome sequence of Klebsormidium flaccidum was published in 2014.

Species 
The  valid species currently considered to belong to this genus are:

 Klebsormidium acidophilum
 Klebsormidium bilatum
 Klebsormidium crenulatum
 Klebsormidium dissectum
 Klebsormidium drouetii
 Klebsormidium elegans
 Klebsormidium fluitans
 Klebsormidium fragile
 Klebsormidium klebsii
 Klebsormidium lamellosum
 Klebsormidium montanum
 Klebsormidium mucosum
 Klebsormidium nitens (Previously known as Klebsormidium flaccidum)
 Klebsormidium pseudostichococcus
 Klebsormidium scopulinum
 Klebsormidium sterile
 Klebsormidium subtile
 Klebsormidium subtilissimum
 Klebsormidium tribonematoideum

Notes

References

External links

 Images of Klebsormidium at Algaebase

Charophyta
Charophyta genera